Trabotivište is a village in the municipality of Delčevo, North Macedonia.

Demographics
According to the 2002 census, the village had a total of 533 inhabitants. Ethnic groups in the village include:

Macedonians 446
Turks 5
Serbs 1
Romani 79
Others 2

References

Villages in Delčevo Municipality